Kuala Kurau is a mukim in Kerian District, Perak, Malaysia.

Geography
Kuala Kurau spans over 138.90 km2 in area with a population of 31,065 people.

References

Kerian District
Mukims of Perak